The Audi A7 is an executive luxury five-door liftback coupé produced by Audi since 2010. Also available as a three-box, four-door saloon in China since 2021, it features a sloping roofline with a steeply raked rear window and integrated boot lid (forming the so-called "Sportback"), and four frameless doors.

Audi Sportback concept (2009)

It features a 7-speed S tronic transmission, quattro permanent all-wheel-drive system, five-link front suspension, continuous damping control shock absorbers, electromechanical steering, ceramic brake discs (380 mm front and 356 mm rear), front 6-piston monobloc aluminium brake calipers, rear floating-caliper brakes and 21-inch wheels.

The vehicle was unveiled at the 2009 Detroit Auto Show, and it also previews the facelifted 2015 A7 Sportback.

First generation (Type 4G8; 2010–2018)

Initial release
The A7 is in essence, a four-door fastback version of the C7-series Audi A6, based on the Volkswagen Group MLB platform. The A7 was released before the more conventional A6 saloon/estate. Both cars share the same core structure, drivetrain, chassis, dashboard and interior, whilst the A7 has its own unique exterior panelwork. It also differs from the A6 in that it uses aluminium for much of its front body structure. The A7 was also the first fastback to appear within the Audi C-platform series since the Avant version of the C2 Audi 100, which was discontinued in 1982.

The vehicle was unveiled in Pinakothek der Moderne art museum in Munich on 26 July 2010, and later at the 2010 Paris Motor Show, 2011 New York Auto Show, Wörthersee Tour 2011 (in Misano Red).

The vehicles went on sale in fall 2010. Early models include 2.8 FSI with multitronic, 3.0 TFSI quattro with seven-speed S tronic, 3.0 TDI quattro with seven-speed S tronic; followed by 3.0 TDI with multitronic.

The 2011 model year A7 introduces FlexRay high speed databus that controls all the driver assistance systems from the A8, but it adds head-up display and active lane assist. Full LED headlamps with Automatic high beam switching or Audi adaptive light (Xenon) with variable headlight range control.

US models went on sale 2012 model year vehicles.

Early models include 3.0 TFSI quattro with an 8-speed automatic transmission.

Audi S7 (2012–2017)

The vehicle was unveiled at the 2011 Frankfurt Auto Show, and later in 2012 Audi quattro Cup.

Delivery of the S7 began in spring 2012.

Similar vehicles
Reviewers have cited the Mercedes-Benz CLS-Class as the inspiration to the Audi A7 in the four-door executive sedan market.

Engines and performance
The following internal combustion engines are available, with variations dependent on market.

Awards
In the ICOTY Awards, the Audi A7 was named the International Car of the Year in 2012.

AutoWeek magazine named the Audi A7 as the Best of the Best/Car for 2012.

Esquire magazine named the Audi A7 as the 2011 Esquire Car of the Year.

Automobile Magazine named the Audi A7 "2012 Automobile of the Year".

Marketing
As part of the A7 Sportback product launch, a launch campaign was created in collaboration with the London advertising agency Bartle Bogle Hegarty. The birth story of the A7 Sportback became the inspiration of the Paper Liberation spot.

As part of the A7 launch in the US, a papercraft version of 2012 Audi A7 was produced.

As part of the S7 launch in the US, a Super Bowl commercial was produced.

2012 update
A7 3.0 TDI quattro (as A7 3.0 BiTDI quattro) was added to the UK market.

The A7 3.0 TDI clean diesel quattro was unveiled at the 2012 Los Angeles Auto Show.

US model of A7 3.0 TDI clean diesel quattro was set to go on sale in fall 2013 as 2014 model year vehicle.

A7 Sportback Black Edition (2013–)
The A7 Sportback Black Edition is a version of the A7 (excluding 3.0 TDI, S7) for the UK market. It includes 21-inch rotor-design alloy wheels with a dark titanium finish with further lowered S line sports suspension, black grille and number plate surrounds and the window frame strips, and by privacy glass extending from the B-pillar rearwards; Piano Black inlays, sports seats upholstered in black Valcona leather, black headlining, BOSE audio system with DAB radio and AMI from SE specification and above, S line equipment package (satellite navigation, light and rain sensors, Xenon all-weather headlights and LED rear lights, Audi drive select adaptive dynamics system, Audi parking system plus, keyless go), powered tailgate operation, electrically adjustable front seats and a powered retractable rear spoiler.

Sales began in November 2012, with deliveries began in early 2013.

RS 7 (2013–2019)

Other options include the exterior mirrors with exposed carbon housings and the all-LED headlights, head-up display, a comfort package, the dynamic package, the dynamic package plus, Bluetooth online car phone, Bang & Olufsen Advanced Sound System.

The vehicle was unveiled at the 2013 NAIAS.

Audi announced the RS 7 Performance along with the RS 6 Performance on 22 October 2015.

Mid-2014 facelift (model year 2015)
Audi unveiled the 2015 A7 facelift in May 2014.
Changes include:
Styling tweaks to the car's exterior, engine line-up, transmission. 
Latest Multi Media Interface modular infotainment platform (faster Nvidia Tegra 3 processor, improved graphics) including handwriting recognition.
Audi connect telematics with 4G mobile internet (and mobile updates for the navigation map).
Adaptive glare-free Matrix LED headlights.
Improved Night Vision Assistant can now recognize animals.
Both TFSI and all three TDI engines now meet the Euro 6 emission standard.

Second generation (Type 4K8; 2018–present)

The second generation of the A7 was revealed in October 2017, officially launched in Germany in February 2018, and has been on sale in Europe since late 2017 and made its debut for the North American market at the North American International Auto Show in Detroit on 12 January 2018. Production started in February 2018 at Audi's Neckarsulm plant.

The RS 7 Sportback was first unveiled at the 2019 Frankfurt Motor Show.

Specifications

 ENGINE TYPE. twin-turbocharged and intercooled DOHC 32-valve V-8, aluminium block and heads, direct fuel injection.
 Displacement. 244 in3, 3996 cm3
 Power.  @ 6250 rpm.
 Torque.  @ 2050 rpm.

A7L
In April 2021, Audi launched the three-box sedan version of the A7, called the A7L. It is only sold in China as the first Audi model manufactured by the SAIC Volkswagen joint venture.

Engine
Further engines will follow soon after the start of production.

All units will receive a 48-volt vehicle electrical system, which together with the belt alternator starter (BAS) comprises the MHEV system (Mild Hybrid Electric Vehicle).

Asia
 China - The second generation A7 Sportback was launched in China in December 2018. An additional extended wheelbase three box sedan variant was launched in China in April 2021 called the A7L. the A7L is manufactured by SAIC-Volkswagen as one of the first Audi products to be produced by SAIC.
 Pakistan - The A7 Sportback MK2 Type C8/4K was Launched in Pakistan in 2019. 
 India - The new A7 was launched in India in 2018.
 Bangladesh - The second generation of the Audi A7 will be the first generation of the A7 to be sold in Bangladesh.
 Oman - The second generation of A7 will be sold in Oman in September 2018.
 Vietnam - Introduced to the Vietnamese market in October 2018.
 Thailand - Introduced to the Thai market in February 2019.

See also 
 Audi A7 sportback h-tron

References

External links
Audi A7 official website (U.S.A)
 Audi Press Release July 2010

A7
Executive cars
Front-wheel-drive vehicles
Vehicles with CVT transmission
All-wheel-drive vehicles
Hatchbacks
Sedans
Plug-in hybrid vehicles
Cars introduced in 2010
2020s cars